Howard Cornick was an American politician from Arizona.  He served a single term in the Arizona State Senate during the 6th Arizona State Legislature, holding one of the two seats from Yavapai County.

Cornick was born in Knoxville, Tennessee in 1874 or 1875.  He was a graduate of University of Tennessee College of Law.  He moved to Arizona in 1918, becoming a partner in the law firm of Favour and Baker, before eventually forming his own law partnership, Cornick and Carr.  He died in Prescott, Arizona on September 2, 1945.

References

Arizona politicians
Democratic Party Arizona state senators
20th-century American politicians
1945 deaths